Alma Rosa Hernández Escobar (28 June 1956 – 5 June 2022) was a Mexican politician. A member of the National Action Party, she served in the Chamber of Deputies from 2021 to 2022.

Hernández died of a respiratory illness in Córdoba, Veracruz on 5 June 2022 at the age of 65.

References

1956 births
2022 deaths
National Action Party (Mexico) politicians
Deputies of the LXV Legislature of Mexico
21st-century Mexican women politicians
Women members of the Chamber of Deputies (Mexico)
Respiratory disease deaths in Mexico
Members of the Chamber of Deputies (Mexico) for Veracruz